Wilhelm Salomon Freund (1831–1915) was a Jewish German lawyer and politician.

Freund was born in Schmiegel (Śmigiel) in the Province of Posen. He received his law degree from the University of Breslau (Wrocław). He served as a member of the Prussian House of Deputies from 1876–79 and a member of the Reichstag from 1879–81. He died in Breslau.

References
Hamburger, Ernest. Juden im öffentlichen Leben Deutschlands. J. C. B. Mohr (Siebeck). Tübingen. 1968  

1831 births
1915 deaths
People from Śmigiel
People from the Province of Posen
Jewish German politicians
German Progress Party politicians
Members of the 4th Reichstag of the German Empire
Members of the Prussian House of Representatives
19th-century German lawyers
University of Breslau alumni